Crang may refer to:

Crâng (disambiguation), the name of some villages in Romania
Crâng Park, a park in Buzău, Romania
Mike Crang, a reader in cultural geography at Durham University, UK

See also
Krang, a villain in the Teenage Mutant Ninja Turtles series
Krang (disambiguation)